Matora is a village in Osian tehsil in Jodhpur district of Rajasthan State, India. Its population was 2,612 as per the 2011 census.

References

Villages in Jodhpur district